Chukadytamak (Soqaźıtamaq) is a rural locality (a selo) in Karamaly-Gubeyevsky Selsoviet, Tuymazinsky District, Bashkortostan, Russia. The population was 398 as of 2010. There are 4 streets.

Geography 
Chukadytamak is located 43 km southeast of Tuymazy (the district's administrative centre) by road. Karamaly-Gubeyevo is the nearest rural locality.

References 

Rural localities in Tuymazinsky District